Wu Hanming (born June 1952) is a Chinese microelectronics engineer and the current vice-president of the Technology R & D department of Semiconductor Manufacturing International Corporation.

Biography
Wu was born in June 1952. During the Down to the Countryside Movement, he became a sent-down youth in his hometown and forced to work in the fields instead of going to middle school. After the resumption of National College Entrance Examination, he obtained a doctor's degree from the University of Science and Technology of China. After graduation, he was a postdoctoral fellow at the University of Texas at Austin and University of California, Berkeley. He was a senior R & D engineer at Novellus Systems and Intel before returning to China. In 1993 he was offered a position at the Institute of Mechanics, Chinese Academy of Sciences. He joined a company in Alabama in 1995. In 1995 he was hired as a chief engineer at Intel. He returned to China in 2001 and became chief technology officer of Semiconductor Manufacturing International Corporation.

Honours and awards
 2008 State Science and Technology Progress Award (Second Class)  
 2013 State Science and Technology Progress Award (Second Class)  
 November 22, 2019 Member of the Chinese Academy of Engineering (CAE)

References

1952 births
Living people
University of Science and Technology of China alumni
Members of the Chinese Academy of Engineering